This is a list of women who have served as members of the Cabinet of Iran.

List

See also 
 List of female members of the Islamic Consultative Assembly

References 

 

Iran
 
Lists of political office-holders in Iran